The Arasvika–Hennset Ferry is a ferry service on County Road 682 across Arasvik Fjord in the Nordmøre district in the Norwegian county of Møre og Romsdal. It connects the Arasvika ferry dock on the island of Ertvågsøya in the municipality of Aure to the Hennset ferry dock on the mainland in the municipality of Halsa. The route is operated by the transport conglomerate Fjord1.

The duration of the passage is 15 minutes, and the  route is served by MF Driva with 22 departures per day in each direction every day. In 2014 the annual average daily traffic was 98 vehicles.

References

External links
Arasvika–Hennset ferry schedule

Ferry transport in Møre og Romsdal